Keephills is a hamlet in central Alberta, Canada within Parkland County. A nearby employer is the Keephills Generating Station.

Demographics 

See also 
List of communities in Alberta
List of hamlets in Alberta

References 

Designated places in Alberta
Hamlets in Alberta
Parkland County